Scoparia resinodes is a species of moth in the family Crambidae. It is endemic in Réunion, where it very common.

See also 
 List of moths of Réunion

References

Scorparia
Endemic fauna of Réunion
Moths of Réunion
Moths described in 1932